US Highway 2 (US 2) is a part of the United States Numbered Highway System that runs from Everett, Washington, to St. Ignace, Michigan. In Wisconsin, the highway enters runs east–west across the northwestern part of the state and re-enters the state in the northeast part. It runs from the Richard I. Bong Memorial Bridge over the Saint Louis Bay at Superior, where it enters from Minnesota, east to the Michigan state line near Hurley. Further east, US 2 re-enters Wisconsin from Michigan in Florence County and briefly traverses that county before re-entering Michigan. US 2 is a Wisconsin Corridors 2020 Connecting route east of its concurrency with US 53. The section concurrent with US 53 is a Wisconsin Corridors 2020 Backbone route.

Route description

Western segment
US 2 enters the state from Minnesota at the city of Superior on the Bong Memorial Bridge. US 2 then follows Belknap Street eastbound, passing through downtown Superior, where it has an intersection with Wisconsin Highway 35 (WIS 35). After the intersection with Moccasin Mike Road, a  freeway segment begins for US 2/US 53 as the highway leaves the city of Superior together. US 2/US 53 has an interchange with WIS 13 near Parkland; WIS 13 begins its course around the Lake Superior shoreline at this point. US 2 and US 53 split in South Range at an unusual interchange at which westbound US 2 traffic must cross over the freeway to the eastbound lanes to access US 53 south. US 2 then continues independently again as a two-lane road, passing through Wentworth, Poplar, and Maple as it heads east to the Douglas–Bayfield county line at Brule. Just west of Brule, US 2 crosses the Brule River State Forest.

US 2 turns northeastward and meets WIS 13, which joins it eastbound as they follow the Lake Superior shoreline closely to the Ashland County line and the City of Ashland. US 2 then continues east, then southeast toward Hurley where it meets US 51 at its northern terminus and immediately enters Michigan.

Eastern segment
US 2 re-enters Wisconsin from Iron County, Michigan concurrently with US 141 and turns southeastward to Florence and intersects WIS 70/WIS 101 at their shared terminus. After a short trek through Florence via Central Avenue, Furnace Street and Florence Avenue, the highway turns south and passes by Commonwealth then turns east and passes through the community of Spread Eagle.

History
In 1918, the western segment of US 2 was old WIS 10 with the exception of the short segment between US 51 and the Michigan state line, which was not a part of the state highway system until Michigan signed their trunkline system a year later. The entire eastern segment was designated as old WIS 69 in 1918. One business route existed for US 2 until 2002. Business US 2 began at the US 51 terminus and headed southeast to WIS 77 in downtown Hurley where it turned east into Michigan. Although Michigan still has the route signed, Wisconsin removed its signs. The street in Hurley that runs from WIS 77 to the border is still a state trunkline despite not having a numbered designation.

Major intersections

See also

References

External links

02
 Wisconsin
Lake Superior Circle Tour
Transportation in Douglas County, Wisconsin
Transportation in Bayfield County, Wisconsin
Transportation in Ashland County, Wisconsin
Transportation in Iron County, Wisconsin
Transportation in Florence County, Wisconsin